House of Assembly elections were held in Tobago on 26 November 1984 to elect the twelve members of the Tobago House of Assembly. The governing Democratic Action Congress won eleven seats with 56.9% of the votes, while the People's National Movement won one seat with 41.7% of the vote.

Results

Notes

References

Tobago
Local elections in Trinidad and Tobago
1984 in Trinidad and Tobago